Berona's War is a book series created by Anthoney Coffey & Jesse Labbé and is published by Archaia Studios Press.  Released books include Berona's Hundred Year War, Berona's War: Field Guide & Berona's War: Cabbalu Tales - Vol. 1: Without Perfection. Additional writers include Bret Kenyon and Opie Cooper.

General 
The book series documents various information on two factions at war on the Isle of Berona, as well as information on the continent's makeup. This information ranges from "units" and weaponry used by the factions to try to eliminate the other, as well as topography of the continent on which they wage their bloody war.

Berona's Hundred Year War and Berona's War: Field Guide document the various "heroes", weaponry, and other aspects of the war. These books are written more like a journal or documentary and set the tone for the stories to come.

Berona's War: Cabbalu Tales - Vol. 1: Without Perfection is a collection of stories from the war going on between the Ele-Alta and the Cropones. The book contains less pictures than the previous two but it isn't devoid of them either.

Berona's War: Fight for Amity is an upcoming book that will be structured in a more comic book style and will be more recollections from the war.

For the readers: Berona's Hundred Year War and Berona's War: Field Guide are essentially the same book, with the Field Guide being the 2nd Edition of the Berona's Hundred Year War. Different cover art and additional material still make the books unique and great collector's items.

Story
On the Isle of Berona, peace no longer exists. 

The Ele-Alta [El-Eh-All-Tuh] and the Cropone [Kra-Pohn] are at war, known from this point on as the "Hundred Year War". This war was triggered by a dispute over land and has since become more and more violent. Many stories have emerged from these battles, with many more not yet recanted to outsiders.

Factions
Ele-Alta:
 Powerful, hard-working
 Close knit group (no divide within the society)
 Indigenous to the mountainous region of Berona

Cropone:
 Highly Intelligent, Problem solvers
 Different beliefs cause separation within the community
 Akin to the grassy, more lush, areas of Berona

References

External links
https://web.archive.org/web/20110913010343/http://www.archaia.com/blog/titles/beronas-hundred-year-war

Archaia Studios Press titles